Odense Central Library (Odense Centralbibliotek; also known as Odense County Library) is the public library for Odense, Denmark, and central library of Funen (except Middelfart Municipality). Established in 1924, it is an integrated part of Odense Railway Station, as a result of a 1995 re-use project. It is visited by about 1.5 million people annually and lends approximately 2.3 million works. Odense Music Library is a main department of Odense County Library, and it contains the largest collection of phonograms in Scandinavia and Denmark's largest number of titles.

References

External links
 

Buildings and structures in Odense
Libraries in Denmark
1924 establishments in Denmark
Libraries established in 1924